Liscooly railway station served the village of Liscooly in County Donegal, Ireland.

The station opened on 7 September 1863 on the Finn Valley Railway line from Strabane to Stranorlar and closed on 1 January 1960.

Routes

References

Disused railway stations in County Donegal
Railway stations opened in 1863
Railway stations closed in 1960